Yehuda Heller-Kahane  (2 December 1743 – 22 April 1819) was a Rabbi, Talmudist, and Halachist in Galicia. He was known as "the Kuntras HaSfeikos" based on his work, Kuntras HaSfeikos.

Life and works 
In 1743 Yehuda was born to his father Yosef in the Galician town of Kalush (presently located in Ukraine). Contrary to some historical reports, Yehuda was not a fourth-generation descendant from Rabbi Yom-Tov Lipmann Heller, but fifth generation. The family tree is shown in Yom Tov's biography (linked above). He was one of five brothers (with Chaim, Mordechai, Daniel, and Aryeh Leib the Ketzos HaChoshen) and one sister.

He was the first Rabbi of Sighet, in Transylvania, that time part of the Kingdom of Hungary (now part of Romania).

R. Yehuda wrote: Kuntras HaSfeikos which documents cases in the g'marah regarding monetary disputes, as well as Terumas Hakri, a commentary on the Shulchan Aruch.

References

External links 
 קונטרס הספיקות (in Hebrew)

1743 births
1819 deaths
People from Kalush, Ukraine
Rabbis of the Austrian Empire
Orthodox rabbis from Galicia (Eastern Europe)
Kohanim writers of Rabbinic literature
Polish Orthodox rabbis